The Real Net Output Ratio (or Vertical Range of Manufacture) describes in a value chain the fraction of the internal (company specific) production on the total production value of one company. The total production value of a company consists of internal production plus the sum of externally produced goods and services.

A Real Net Output Ratio of 0% relates to a company that does not have its own production and therefore only does trading.

Production economics
Supply chain management